Thomas Benjamin Jones (23 March 1920 – 1972) was an English professional footballer who played as a winger for Tranmere Rovers, Chelsea and Accrington Stanley in the Football League. He was born in Frodsham, Cheshire.

References

1920 births
1972 deaths
People from Frodsham
English footballers
Association football wingers
Ellesmere Port Town F.C. players
Tranmere Rovers F.C. players
Chelsea F.C. players
Accrington Stanley F.C. (1891) players
Dartford F.C. players
English Football League players
Sportspeople from Cheshire